Strychnine.213 is the sixth album by Belgian death metal band Aborted. It was released on June 20, 2008, through Century Media Records. The sample used in the song "A Murmur in Decrepit Wits" is Aborted's take on a 1980s interview with Charles Manson.

Track listing

Personnel

Aborted
Sven "Svencho" de Caluwé – vocals
Sebastian Tuvi – guitar, backing vocals
Peter Goemaere – guitar
Dan Wilding – drums
Sven Janssens – bass

Production
Alan Douches – mastering
Gail Liebling – producer, engineer
Eric Rachel – mixing

References

2008 albums
Aborted (band) albums
Century Media Records albums